Vaughtia squamata is a species of sea snail, a marine gastropod mollusk in the family Muricidae, the murex snails or rock snails.

Description
The length of the shell attains 15.5 mm.

Distribution
This marine species occurs off Mauretania.

References

External links
 Houart, R. (2003). Two new muricids (Gastropoda: Muricidae) from west Africa. Novapex. 4 (2-3): 51-56

squamata
Gastropods described in 2003